Spanioneura is a genus of sap-sucking insects belonging to the order Hemiptera. There are five described species in Spanioneura.

Species
 Spanioneura caucasica Loginova 1968
 Spanioneura fonscolombii Foerster, 1848
 Spanioneura pechai (Klimaszewski & Lodos 1977)
 Spanioneura persica Burckhardt & Lauterer 1993
 Spanioneura turkiana (Klimaszewski & Lodos 1977)

References

Psyllidae
Psylloidea genera
Taxa named by Arnold Förster